14th Avenue may refer to:

14th (VIVA), a station on Viva (bus rapid transit)
York Regional Road 71

See also
14th Street (disambiguation)